The London and North Eastern Railway (LNER) D41 class was a type of 4-4-0 steam locomotive inherited from the Great North of Scotland Railway (GNSR). The class consisted of two similar GNSR classes: 'S' (introduced in 1893 and designed by James Johnson) and 'T' (introduced in 1895 and designed by William Pickersgill). The two classes were similar but with detail differences to the boiler.

Construction history

Class S
In December 1893 six locomotives were supplied by Neilson (works nos. 4640-4646) and were numbered 78-83.

Class T
Between December 1895 and February 1898 a further twenty six locomotives were supplied in two batches by Neilson (works nos. 4877-90 and 5212-23), fitted with a larger boiler. Nine of these had been reboilered between 1916 and 1923, making them indistinguishable from the 'S' class, and the remainder were similarly reboilered by the London and North Eastern Railway (LNER) after 1923. The LNER therefore treated them all as a single class, 'D41'.

British Railways
The first locomotive was withdrawn in 1946, but 22 locomotives passed into British Railways ownership in 1948. BR renumbered them by adding 60000 to their 1946 LNER number.

The last locomotive was withdrawn in 1953, and all have been scrapped.

References

External links
 LNER database Class D41

4-4-0 locomotives
Great North of Scotland Railway
D41
Neilson locomotives
Railway locomotives introduced in 1893
Scrapped locomotives
Standard gauge steam locomotives of Great Britain
Passenger locomotives